Notholithocarpus densiflorus, commonly known as the tanoak or tanbark-oak, is a broadleaf tree in the family Fagaceae, and the type species of the genus Notholithocarpus. It is native to the far western United States, particularly Oregon and California.

Description
The bark is fissured, and ranges from gray to brown.

The leaves are alternate, with toothed margins and a hard, leathery texture, and persist for three to four years. At first they are covered in dense orange-brown scurfy hairs on both sides, but those on the upper surface soon wear off; those on the under surface persist longer but eventually wear off too.

The nut sits in a cup during its 18-month maturation; the outside surface of the cup is rough with short spines. The nuts are produced in clusters of a few together on a single stem.

Currently, the largest known tanoak specimen is on private timberland near the town of Ophir, Oregon.

Notholithocarpus densiflorus var. echinoides
The variety intergrades with the type in northwest California and southwest Oregon. Tanoak grows as a shrub on serpentine soils.

Taxonomy
By 2008, the species was moved into a new genus, Notholithocarpus (from Lithocarpus), based on multiple lines of evidence. It is most closely related to the north temperate oaks (Quercus) and not as closely related to the Asian tropical stone oaks (Lithocarpus, where it was previously placed), but instead is an example of convergent morphological evolution.

While related to oaks (as well as chestnuts), the name is written as 'tanoak' because it is not a true oak.

Distribution
It is native to the far western United States, found in southwest Oregon and in California as far south as the Transverse Ranges and east in the Sierra Nevada.

Ecology
Tanoak is shade tolerant and benefits from disturbances. It is susceptible to wildfire, wounds from which are exploited by rot fungi. It one of the species most seriously affected by "sudden oak death" (Phytophthora ramorum), with high mortality reported over much of the species' range.

Fine hairs on the young leaves and twigs discourage deer from eating them. Various animals, including squirrels, deer and bears, eat the nuts.

Uses
The nut kernel is very bitter, and is inedible for people without extensive leaching. Some California Native Americans prefer this nut to those of many oak acorns because it stores well due to the comparatively high tannin content. The Concow tribe call the nut hä’-hä (Konkow language). The Hupa people use the acorns to make meal, from which they would make mush, bread, biscuits, pancakes, and cakes. They also roast the acorns and eat them. Roasted, the seeds can be used as a coffee substitute.

The name tanoak refers to its tannin-rich bark, a type of tanbark, used in the past for tanning leather before the use of modern synthetic tannins.  By 1907, the use of tanoak for tannin was subsiding due to the scarcity of large tanoak trees. There were not enough trees around for a worthwhile economic return. By the early 1960s, there were only a few natural tannin operations left in California. The industry was beginning to switch to a synthetic alternative.
Tanoak tannin has been used as an astringent.

A mulch made from the leaves of the plant can repel grubs and slugs.

The wood is strong and sometimes used as lumber, but suitable trees are usually inaccessible. It is also used as firewood.

References

External links

 
 
 Interactive Distribution Map of Lithocarpus densiflorus
 Forest Service Fire Ecology

Fagaceae
Monotypic Fagales genera
Plants used in Native American cuisine
Trees of the Southwestern United States
Trees of the Northwestern United States
Flora of California
Flora of the Sierra Nevada (United States)
Natural history of the California Coast Ranges